Cinderella's Stepsister is a 2010 South Korean television series starring Moon Geun-young, Chun Jung-myung, Seo Woo, and Ok Taecyeon. Applying a modern twist to the classic fairy tale, the story follows the contentious relationship between two stepsisters as their lives and loves intertwine. Written by Kim Gyu-wan, and directed by Kim Young-jo and Kim Won-seok, it aired on KBS2 from March 31 to June 3, 2010 on Wednesdays and Thursdays at 21:55 for 20 episodes.

Synopsis
Ever since she was young, Eun-jo (Moon Geun-young) has learned to trust no one and live strong on her own. Used to being dragged from one broken home to another by her manipulative, money-grabbing mother (Lee Mi-sook), Eun-jo doesn't know what to make of her mother's latest catch Dae-sung (Kim Kap-soo), the solemn head of a traditional rice wine brewery. Both Dae-sung and his daughter, bubbly spoiled princess Hyo-sun (Seo Woo), warmly welcome wary young Eun-jo into their sprawling home, and treat her with a kindness that she simply can't stomach. Instead, she forms a bond with brewery staff Ki-hoon (Chun Jung-myung), the first person to see past her tough act, and it is his betrayal that will hurt the most. However, Dae-sung's genuine kindness to her eventually melts Eun-jo's defenses, and she learns to trust and love her stepfather. Naive Hyo-sun, meanwhile, stubbornly seeks affection at every turn, only to slowly realize she's losing Ki-hoon and everything else in her life to her cold stepsister. Eight years later, Jung-woo (Ok Taecyeon) reappears in Eun-jo's life, a boy she used to treat as her little brother who is now a young man determined to win her heart. Reluctant sisters Eun-jo and Hyo-sun both experience angst and rivalry, as their polar-opposite personalities and love-hate relationship bring them through many ups and downs from adolescence to adulthood.

Cast
 Moon Geun-young as Song Eun-jo/Goo Eun-jo - A cynical and shy young woman, Eun-jo is good at hiding her emotions and does not get attached to people easily. She is skeptical of her stepfather's kindness; however, she later realizes that it is genuine and this realization begins to break her hard exterior. Eun-jo is in love with Ki-hoon, and is hurt when he leaves, leading her to be cold and reject him when he returns 8 years later. She later mourns her stepfather's death.
 Seo Woo as Goo Hyo-sun - A gentle and brilliant girl who has been treated like a princess her entire life. However, she is lonely and becomes excited when she learns that she'll be getting a new mother and sister. When her new family members are different from what she expected, it takes a toll on her. Hyo-sun is slightly spoiled and becomes jealous of her new stepsister.
 Chun Jung-myung as Hong Ki-hoon - Gentle, handsome, and kind, Ki-hoon sees much of himself in Eun-jo. However, when his difficult and broken family situation causes him to leave the winery, he disappears, leaving Eun-jo a letter that she never receives. Ki-hoon returns 8 years later and appears to be a spy for his evil step-family's company, but not everything is as it seems.
 Ok Taec-yeon as Han Jung-woo - Jung-woo is the adopted son of one of Song Kang-sook's ex-lovers. Eun-jo is the first person to care for him when he was a child, which creates a deep affection in him. Jung-woo finds Eun-jo at the winery 8 years later in order to be near her and declare his love for her. Jung-woo is selfless, reliable and always cares for Eun-jo. 
Moon Suk-hwan as young Han Jung-woo
 Lee Mi-sook as Song Kang-sook - Eun-jo's mother. Knows how to get what she wants, and marries Go Dae-sung for his wealth. Though initially an evil stepmother who fakes affection for her new family, Kang-sook does love her daughter Eun-jo in her own way and begins to change as a result of Dae-sung's love for her.
 Kim Kap-soo as Goo Dae-sung - Hyo-sun's father and Eun-jo's stepfather. Dae-sung is kindhearted, genuine, and loving. His character and goodness causes changes in everyone around him for the better.
 Kang Sung-jin as Yang Hae-jin
 Choi Il-hwa as Chairman Hong
 Yeon Woo-jin as Dong-soo
 Go Se-won as Hong Ki-jung, Ki-hoon's manipulative and calculating older half-brother, who does not even acknowledge Ki-hoon as his brother.
 Seo Hyun-chul as Kang-sook's true love
 Kim Chung as Ki-hoon's stepmother

Original soundtrack
 너 아니면 안돼 (It Has To Be You) - Yesung of Super Junior
 불러본다 (Calling Out) - Luna and Krystal of f(x)
 스마일 어게인 - Lee Yoon-jong
 너 였다고 - JM
 내 사랑을 구해줘! - Pink Toniq
 신데렐라언니
 미소지으면
 보사노바
 그때 그 자리에
 사랑한다면
 뒷동산
 마이너 왈츠
 느리게 걷기
 후회
 모정
 내 사랑을 구해줘! (Rock version) - Pink Toniq

Ratings

Awards and nominations

Adaptation

A Chinese remake of Cinderella's Stepsister, called Symphony of Fate, was produced in 2011.

References

External links
  
 
 
 
 'Cinderella's Sister'' at AStory Co., Ltd.

Korean Broadcasting System television dramas
2010 South Korean television series debuts
2010 South Korean television series endings
Korean-language television shows
South Korean romance television series
South Korean melodrama television series
Television series by AStory